Marian is a 2014 Philippine television variety show broadcast by GMA Network. Directed by Louie Ignacio and Mark A. Reyes, it was hosted by Marian Rivera. It premiered on June 21, 2014. The show concluded on December 6, 2014 with a total of 25 episodes. It was replaced by Himig ng Pasko in its timeslot.

Hosts

 Marian Rivera

Co-hosts
 Julie Anne San Jose
 Christian Bautista
 Mark Bautista 
 Paolo Ballesteros

Segments
 Celebrity Dance Showdown
 Marian's Dance Steps
 Playlist

Ratings
According to AGB Nielsen Philippines' Mega Manila household television ratings, the pilot episode of Marian earned a 21.5% rating. While the final episode scored a 20.4% rating. The show got its highest rating on August 9, 2014 with a 27.1% rating which featured Dingdong Dantes' marriage proposal to Marian Rivera.

Accolades

References

External links
 

2014 Philippine television series debuts
2014 Philippine television series endings
Filipino-language television shows
GMA Network original programming
Philippine variety television shows